The American Turkish Society (ATS) is the oldest non-for-profit, apolitical organization based in America dedicated to building bridges between the United States and Turkey. The Society hosts a broad spectrum of programming, including lectures, workshops, symposia, conferences, festivals, performances, and exhibitions that highlight topics of relevance to the Turkish-American community and help to promote Turkish arts and culture in the United States.

History
The American Turkish Society was founded on June 29, 1949, when eight men gathered in New York City to announce its establishment. Its founding members were Selim Sarper, Ernest Jackh, Asa Jennings, Lewis Owen, Charles Wylie, and three Turkish representatives, ex-oficio. The organization was formed in order to further cross-cultural understanding between the United States and Turkey. In 1979, the organization restructured and Atlantic Records founder, Ahmet Ertegun, became chairman of the board of directors. He served as chairman until his death in 2006. The organization is currently co-chaired by Suzan Sabanci Dincer, Chair of Akbank and Michael M. Roberts, President, CEO and Executive Director of HSBC North America Holdings Inc and manages The Society’s operations with an impressive list of Board of Directors.

Programs and activities

Lectures, Panels, Gatherings 
The Society presents seasonal gatherings, lectures, panels and webinars that cover a variety of cultural, historical, economic and educational topics that surround U.S.-Turkey relations and run parallel with The Society’s mission.

Meet the Ambassadors 
Meet the Ambassadors program is one of The Society’s most significant event series that hosts American and Turkish Ambassadors and Consul Generals to discuss issues of current importance in U.S.-Turkey relations. The Society is renowned for providing high-level geo-political panels that shed light on US Turkey relations, and, in this regard, the Ambassador Series (Meet the Ambassadors) is our signature event. Past speakers have included Ambassadors Feridun H. Sinirlioglu, Mort Abramowitz, Ertugrul Apakan, Eric  Edelman, Marc Grossman, James Jeffrey, O. Faruk Logoglu, Mark Parris, W. Robert Pearson, Ross  Wilson, Baki Ilkin, Nabi Sensoy, Namik Tan and Consul General Jennifer L. Davis.

Scholarships & Grants 
The American Turkish Society provides several scholarships, grants, and awards to students, educators, and artists, in the United States and Turkey. Scholarships include The Ahmet Ertegun Memorial Scholarship at The Juilliard, The Arif Mardin Music Fellowship at Berklee and Summer Residency Program at the School of Visual Arts.

The Society’s Moon and Stars Project (MASP) grants are dedicated to highlighting Turkey's arts and culture scene and establishing a two-way cultural interaction between the United States and Turkey. The Society awards competitive grants to support emerging and established artists in an effort to promote this cross-cultural dialogue.

New York Turkish Film Festival 
The New York Turkish Film Festival (NYTFF) was founded by the Moon and Stars Project, a non-profit organization dedicated to highlighting the changing face of Turkish arts and culture in 1999. Ever since its foundation, The Society was proud to support and sponsor NYTFF. In 2009, The Moon and Stars Project started operating under the umbrella of ATS and ever since, The Society continued to present the renowned NYTFF to film lovers in New York. In addition to showcasing award winning Turkish films, the festival comprises workshops and Q&A’s featuring filmmakers, film directors and actors/actresses who are invited from Turkey to participate in the festival.

Young Society Leaders 
In 2011, The American Turkish Society launched The Young Society Leaders (YSL), a key program of The Society that recognizes the most outstanding young leaders accomplished in their respective fields such as business, law, medicine, journalism, international affairs, academia, the arts, and design. YSLs are all dedicated to furthering the mission of The Society and improving the future of US-Turkish business, diplomatic and cultural ties by sharing skills, professional expertise, and network with impact and increased reach. Specifically, the YSL program has three objectives: to build a diverse community of peers; to nurture and support the next generation of leaders for The Society and the community at large; and to positively influence issues that impact matters related to the American-Turkish community.

Next Generation Council 
The Society launched the Next Generation Council (NGC) in 2021. The purpose of the NGC is to engage young and less experienced members with strong future potential to be involved with The American Turkish Society and prepare them as potential future Board members.  The Council works very closely with the Board and the Executive Committee and undertakes important responsibilities assigned to it by the Board.

Annual Gala 
The Society inaugurated its Annual Gala dinner in 2006 to celebrate successful joint ventures between American and Turkish corporations, starting with the 50-year partnership of Ford Motor Company and Koç Holding in Turkey. Our celebrations have since highlighted the partnerships of Citi-Sabancı Holding; GE and Doğuş Group; The Coca-Cola Company and Anadolu Group; Turkcell’s ten years on the New York Stock Exchange; Turner Broadcasting Systems and Doğan Media Group. In 2013 we celebrated our 65th anniversary with a Gala on the floor of the New York Stock Exchange. In 2015, The Society expanded the conversation by recognizing philanthropic and humanitarian accomplishments by honoring Hüsnü Özyeğin, Founder and Chairman of FIBA Holding and Hamdi Ulukaya, Founder and CEO of Chobani. Since then, The Society has honored the Endometriosis Foundation of America, Yemeksepeti, Dr. Oz, The Vehbi Koc Foundation and most recently, Mica and Ahmet Ertegun in 2021. As The Society’s main fundraising event, the dinner raises support for our educational and cultural programs, including scholarships, exchanges, residencies, cultural performances, lectures, and grants.

References

Turkish-American culture in New York (state)
Turkish-American history
Lobbying organizations in the United States
Non-profit organizations based in New York (state)
Turkey–United States relations
United States friendship associations